Masaka District is a district in Buganda Kingdom in Uganda. Its main town is Masaka City, whose estimated population in 2011 was 74,100.

Location
The district is bordered by Bukomansimbi District to the north-west, Kalungu District to the north, Kalangala District to the east and south, Rakai District to the south-west, and Lwengo District to the west. The coordinates of the district are 00 30S, 31 45E.

Overview

Masaka District was established in the 1900s, composed of the Buganda Kingdom's former counties of Buddu, Kooki, Kabula, Mawogola, and Ssese Islands. Kooki and Kabula were peeled off to form Rakai District. Later, the northern part of Rakai District was removed to form Lyantonde District. The Ssese Islands were removed to form Kalangala District. In 1997, Mawogola County was split from Buddu and was named Sembabule District. Buddu remained as Masaka District. In 2010, Buddu itself was split into four districts, namely Masaka District, Bukomansimbi District, Kalungu District, and Lwengo District.

Administratively, the district council is the highest political authority. The council has  43 members headed by a district chairperson. The technical team at the district is subdivided into the following directories: 1. Education & Sports 2. Health & Environment 3. Works & Technical Services 4. Production & Marketing 5. Finance & Planning 6. Management Support Services 7. Gender & Community Services.

Population
The 1991 national population census estimated the district population at 203,600. The 2002 census estimated the population at 228,200, with an annual population growth rate of 1.0 percent. In 2012, the population was estimated at 251,600.

See also
Districts of Uganda
Buganda Kingdom

References

External links
 Masaka Loses Revenue To Newly Created Districts

 
Districts of Uganda
Central Region, Uganda
Lake Victoria